Fontaine-Guérin is a former commune in the Maine-et-Loire department in western France. On 1 January 2016, it was merged into the new commune of Les Bois-d'Anjou.

See also
Communes of the Maine-et-Loire department

References

Fontaineguerin